Elkhan Ahmadov (born 2 July 1993) is an Azerbaijani football goalkeeper who plays for Sabail in the Azerbaijan Premier League.

Club career
On 20 October 2013, Ahmadov made his debut in the Azerbaijan Premier League for Baku match against Shuvalan.

References

External links
 

1993 births
Living people
Association football goalkeepers
Azerbaijani footballers
Azerbaijan Premier League players
FC Baku players
Sabail FK players